Shelly Frank is a United States restaurant executive best known as the former head of the Mexican-restaurant franchise Chi-Chi's, serving as its CEO, Chairman, and President from 1977 to 1986.  He was credited as "spearheading Chi-Chi's growth from a single Minneapolis restaurant to a national chain."

Frank was a Kentucky Fried Chicken executive when he left to join Chi-Chi's as president and chief operating officer in October 1977. He had also done previous stints at McDonald's and Burger King  Frank subsequently became CEO of Chi-Chi's in April 1978 and chairman in March 1982.

By the time Frank left the chain, it had grown to approximately 200 locations, consisting of 120 company-owned outlets and 78 franchise locations.  Chi-Chi's replacement was Hal Smith, then-president of Chili's.

References

External links
Shelly Frank's PBWiki Bio (by Shelly Frank)

Living people
Year of birth missing (living people)
American restaurateurs
American chief executives of food industry companies
American chief operating officers